Kendra McMullan (born 26 May 1993) is a Northern Irish former footballer who played as a midfielder and appeared for the Northern Ireland women's national team.

Career
Club captain McMullan won the IFA Women's Challenge Cup with Sion Swifts in 2017, scoring both goals in the 2–0 final win over Newry City at Windsor Park in Belfast. She retired from football aged 26 years old in August 2019, after suffering from injuries and illness.

McMullan was capped for the Northern Ireland national team, appearing for the team during the 2019 FIFA Women's World Cup qualifying cycle.

References

External links
 
 
 

1993 births
Living people
Women's association footballers from Northern Ireland
Northern Ireland women's international footballers
Women's association football midfielders
Sion Swifts Ladies F.C. players
Women's Premiership (Northern Ireland) players